Stephanus Le Roux Marais (1896 – 25 May 1979) was a South African composer.

Marais was born in Bloemfontein district, Orange Free State. He studied at the South African College of Music in Cape Town and at the Royal College of Music in London.  In the subsequent 32 years he held various positions as church organist and teacher.  He was a pioneer of the Afrikaans art song.  In 1928 his "Vier Afrikaanse Sangstukke" (Four Afrikaans Song Pieces) was published.  In the five years following, he was awarded 23 diplomas at the Cape Town Eisteddfod.

He composed the music for the well known songs "Die Roos" and "Kom dans Klaradyn".

Stephanus was married to Edith Johanna Rex. She was the daughter of Mortimer Frederick Rex and Barendina Johanna Van der Merwe. He died in Graaff-Reinet, aged 83. His wife died in September 2010 at Graaff-Reinet.

References
 Beyers C.J. (Ed) 1987. Suid-Afrikaanse Biografiese Woordeboek ('South African Biographic Dictionary'). Raad vir Geesteswetesnkaplike Navorsing, Pretoria. Vol 5 p 519

1896 births
1979 deaths
People from the Free State (province)
Afrikaner people
South African composers
South African male composers
20th-century composers
20th-century male musicians